The Cape Breton coal strike of 1981 was a strike by coal miners who were members of the United Mine Workers of America against the Cape Breton Development Corporation (DEVCO) of Cape Breton Island, Nova Scotia, Canada. The strike, which was bitter and violent, began in the middle of July 1981, and ended in early October of that year.

Historical context
Coal miners in Nova Scotia were first organized by the Provincial Workmen's Association (PWA) in 1897. The United Mine Workers of America (UMWA) attempted to organize the miners and supplant the PWA in 1908. The two unions fought for control, but in 1917 joined forces and formed the Amalgamated Mine Workers of Nova Scotia. The Amalgamated affiliated fully with UMWA a year later. Miners were represented continuously by UMWA over the next 80 years.

Strikes during this period were exceedingly rare. Nevertheless, major work stoppages occurred in 1920s. In 1920, the British Empire Steel Corporation (BESCO) took ownership of all gold, silver and coal mines in Nova Scotia. UMWA and BESCO had an extremely adversarial relationship. After BESCO slashed wages by a third in 1922, 12,000 outraged union members struck. Twelve hundred Canadian Militia cavalry troops were sent to Cape Breton to keep order, and machine gun nests were set up to protect BESCO property. After eight months, BESCO agreed to cut wages by only 18 percent, an agreement neither side was very happy with.

During a steelworkers' strike in the summer of 1923, mounted provincial police attacked a crowd of women and children on July 1, 1923, in what became known as Bloody Sunday. The miners' union struck in protest. Federal troops were called in to break both strikes. Six months later, when the miners' contract expired, BESCO proposed wage cuts totaling 20 percent. The union struck again, and a new contract restoring the wage cut was reached in April 1924.

William Davis Miners' Memorial Day 
Then on March 6, 1925, UMWA struck again, this time to win a wage increase to restore income to its 1922 levels. Twelve thousand miners walked out. BESCO police began terrorizing citizens in mining towns throughout the province, charging even small groups of people on horseback and beating anyone they caught. BESCO, which owned most of the electrical utilities and grocery stores in the mining towns, cut off power and credit. By June, thousands of families were on the verge of starvation. On June 11, approximately 3,000 men and boys gathered in the town of New Waterford and marched on the city's BESCO-owned power plant, determined to restore water and power service to their homes. The strikers and their supporters were confronted by 100 mounted, armed police. In what became known as the "William Davis Miners' Memorial Day", the police attacked. Several policemen fired into the crowd, hitting three. Gilbert Watson and Michael O'Handley were wounded, but William Davis died from a bullet in the heart. (For decades, Nova Scotian miners refused to work on June 11. The date is now a public holiday known as Davis Day.)

Several days of rioting followed, and more than 2,000 Canadian Army soldiers were sent to the province on July 16, 1925, to restore order. It was the second-largest domestic use of military force in Canadian history (only the use of the Army during the North-West Rebellion in 1885 was larger). In the 1925 provincial election, Edgar Nelson Rhodes, a Conservative, was elected Premier of Nova Scotia. Rhodes quickly negotiated a temporary settlement of the strike under which a Royal Commission would investigate the dispute. A tentative settlement on the union's terms was reached in August. Despite a brief resumption of strike activity on August 5, the strike ended on August 9, 1925.

The strike broke BESCO. The company was reorganized, and emerged in 1927 as the Dominion Steel and Coal Corporation. Technological innovation, the difficulty of mining coal (coal in Nova Scotia was increasingly mined from veins under the sea floor), and the availability of natural gas (piped from oil fields in Western Canada) led to rapid decreases in the amount of coal mined as well as the number of miners. The economic viability of the Nova Scotia mines declined significantly. In 1967, the Parliament of Canada nationalized the Cape Breton mines. The Cape Breton Development Corporation (DEVCO), a public company owned by the Government of Canada, took ownership of the mines.

Strike 
On July 17, 1981, 3,500 miners in the Cape Breton coal fields went on strike against DEVCO. The miners sought a 60 percent wage increase over two years. It was the first strike since nationalization of the mines in 1967. But after a three-month-long strike in the United States in the spring of 1981, UMWA had little money left in the international union's strike fund. The Nova Scotia miners were deeply angered that UMWA was unable to support their strike. To support the strike effort, the local union organized a United Mine Workers Wives Association to raise funds and provide food, financial support, and other charity for strikers' families.

The 13-week strike was a bitter one. When the Cabinet of Canadian Prime Minister Pierre Trudeau met in Sydney, Nova Scotia, in early September 1981, striking miners forced their way onto the airport tarmac and cornered Finance Minister Allan MacEachen and External Affairs Minister Mark MacGuigan to demand an end to the strike. Three federal mediators attempted to negotiate an end to the strike, and three times the miners rejected tentative contracts (the last one proposing a 50 percent wage hike over three years).

Vandalism against company property began in August, and quickly escalated. In mid-September, a bomb was detonated at a DEVCO mine, and DEVCO coal rail cars derailed at the company's Lingan mine in New Waterford.

A fourth federal mediator arrived just days after the bombings. The strike finally ended on October 3, 1981, with a tentative agreement which raised wages 50 percent over two years. The pact was ratified by the union a few days later.

Aftermath
Seething over the international union's inability to fund the strike, dissident miners attempted to organize their own union with the help and support of the Confederation of Canadian Unions (CCU). The attempt to decertify the United Mine Workers and replace it with a new union was part of a larger movement among Canadian labour unions to split away from their parent "international" unions in the U.S. Widespread discontent existed over the amount of dues sent to international union headquarters in America (many Canadian unions called them "profits") and the relatively minor attention given to the problems of Canadian workers in return.

The CCU founded the Canadian Mineworkers Union, and began an organizing campaign in late 1981. In a federally-supervised union election in March 1983, the miners voted 1,750 to 1,393 against affiliating with the CMU. CMU forced a second election in March 1984, but the miners rejected disaffiliation a second time by a vote of 1,795 to 1,242. CMU's support declined quickly thereafter, as miners became disenchanted with the constant campaigning for votes. UMWA was never challenged again, and continued to represent miners on Cape Breton Island for the next 17 years.

The economic viability of the Cape Breton coal mines continued to decline, however. DEVCO closed all mines in 2001, and the local UMWA union disbanded.

Notes

References
Boase, Sharon. "Johnny Fought for the Underdog." Hamilton Spectator. November 13, 2007.
Brady, Sheila. "Trudeau, Cabinet Meet to Work Out Budget, Improving Economic Problems." United Press International. September 9, 1981.
"Canadian News Briefs." United Press International. March 10, 1983.
"Canadian News Briefs." United Press International. March 8, 1984.
Coats, R.H. "The Labour Movement in Canada." Annals of the American Academy of Political and Social Science. May 1923.
"Cape Breton's Last Underground Coal Mine Closing." CBC News. November 22, 2001.
DePalma, Anthony. "Canada Shuts Atlantic Coal Mines for Efficiency." New York Times. August 28, 2001.
Donham, Parker Barss. "Bitter Strike Ends Bitterly." Maclean's. October 19, 1981.
Earle, Michael and Gamberg, Herbert. "The United Mine Workers and the Coming of the CCF to Cape Breton." Workers and the State in Twentieth Century Nova Scotia. Michael Earle, ed. Fredericton, Nova Scotia: Acadiensis Press, 1989. 
Forbes, Ernest R. The Maritime Rights Movement, 1919-1927. Paperback ed. Montreal: McGill-Queen's University Press, 1979. 
Frank, David. "Industrial Democracy and Industrial Legality: The UMWA in Nova Scotia, 1908-1927." In The United Mine Workers of America: A Model of Industrial Solidarity? John H.M. Laslett, ed. State College, Penn.: Pennsylvania State University Press, 1996. 
Franklin, Ben A. "Miners' President Receives Praise on Trip Promoting New Coal Pact." New York Times. June 2, 1981.
"InDepth: Cape Breton: The Unions." CBC News. December 8, 2004.
Lamey, Christina M. "Davis Day Through the Years: A Cape Breton Coalmining Tradition." Nova Scotia Historical Review. December 1996.
"Lengthy Coal Strike Seen in Nova Scotia." Associated Press. August 6, 1981.
Macgillivray, Don. "Military Aid to the Civil Power: The Cape Breton Experience in the 1920s." In Cape Breton Historical Essays. Don Macgillivray and Brian Tennyson, eds. Sydney, Nova Scotia: College of Cape Breton, 1980. 
Mackay, Ian and Morton, Suzanne. "The Maritimes: Expanding the Circle of Resistance." In The Workers' Revolt in Canada, 1917-1925. Craig Heron, ed. Toronto: University of Toronto Press, 1998. 
MacKinnon, Harvey. "Cape Breton Coal Unrest." New Maritimes. February 1983.
Martin, Douglas. "A Canadian Split on Unions." New York Times. March 12, 1984.
Meller, John. The Company Store: James Bryson McLachlan and the Cape Breton Coal Miners, 1900-1925. Toronto: Doubleday Canada Limited, 1983. 
Plaskin, Robert. "Nova Scotia Premier to Meet With Striking Miners." United Press International. September 16, 1981.
Plaskin, Robert. "Regional News." United Press International. October 5, 1981.
"Regional News." United Press International. September 19, 1981.
Remple, Chris. "Cape Breton Miners Tell Story of Their Fight." The Militant. March 27, 2000.
Tupper, Allan. "Public Enterprise as Social Welfare: The Case of the Cape Breton Development Corporation." Canadian Public Policy. Autumn 1978.
Wanamaker, Glenn. "UMW Makes Important Gains." New Maritimes. February 1983.
Wanamaker, Glenn. "A Relieved UMW Promises Reform." New Maritimes. April 1983.

See also 
 Canadian Mineworkers Union
William Davis Miners' Memorial Day

External links
Cape Breton Miners' Museum
Cape Breton Development Corporation

Labour disputes in Nova Scotia
Culture of Nova Scotia
Labor disputes led by the United Mine Workers of America
Miners' labour disputes in Canada
1981 labor disputes and strikes
1981 in Nova Scotia